Natthanan Junkrajang (born 13 April 1986 in Sing Buri, Thailand) is a Thai swimmer. At the 2008 Summer Olympics, she competed in the women's 100 and 200 m freestyle events.  She competed at the 2012 Summer Olympics in the Women's 200 and 400 metre freestyle events, finishing 30th in the 200 m heats and 29th in the 400 m heats, failing to qualify for the final.

References

External links

Natthanan Junkrajang
1986 births
Living people
Natthanan Junkrajang
Swimmers at the 2008 Summer Olympics
Swimmers at the 2012 Summer Olympics
Swimmers at the 2016 Summer Olympics
Natthanan Junkrajang
Swimmers at the 2006 Asian Games
Swimmers at the 2010 Asian Games
Swimmers at the 2014 Asian Games
Swimmers at the 2018 Asian Games
Southeast Asian Games medalists in swimming
Natthanan Junkrajang
Natthanan Junkrajang
Competitors at the 2005 Southeast Asian Games
Competitors at the 2007 Southeast Asian Games
Competitors at the 2009 Southeast Asian Games
Competitors at the 2011 Southeast Asian Games
Competitors at the 2013 Southeast Asian Games
Competitors at the 2015 Southeast Asian Games
Competitors at the 2017 Southeast Asian Games
Competitors at the 2019 Southeast Asian Games
Natthanan Junkrajang
Natthanan Junkrajang
Natthanan Junkrajang
Competitors at the 2021 Southeast Asian Games
Natthanan Junkrajang